Influenza A virus subtype H5N1 (A/H5N1) is a subtype of the influenza A virus which can cause illness in humans and many other species. A bird-adapted strain of H5N1, called HPAI A(H5N1) for highly pathogenic avian influenza virus of type A of subtype H5N1, is the highly pathogenic causative agent of H5N1 flu, commonly known as avian influenza ("bird flu"). It is enzootic (maintained in the population) in many bird populations, especially in Southeast Asia. One strain of HPAI A(H5N1) is spreading globally after first appearing in Asia. It is epizootic (an epidemic in nonhumans) and panzootic (affecting animals of many species, especially over a wide area), killing tens of millions of birds and spurring the culling of hundreds of millions of others to stem its spread. Many references to "bird flu" and H5N1 in the popular media refer to this strain.

According to the World Health Organization (WHO) and the United Nations Food and Agriculture Organization, H5N1 pathogenicity is gradually continuing to rise in endemic areas, but the avian influenza disease situation in farmed birds is being held in check by vaccination, and there is "no evidence of sustained human-to-human transmission" of the virus. Eleven outbreaks of H5N1 were reported worldwide in June 2008, in five countries (China, Egypt, Indonesia, Pakistan and Vietnam) compared to 65 outbreaks in June 2006, and 55 in June 2007. The global HPAI situation significantly improved in the first half of 2008, but the FAO reports that imperfect disease surveillance systems mean that occurrence of the virus remains underestimated and underreported. As of May 2020, the WHO reported a total of 861 confirmed human cases which resulted in the deaths of 455 people since 2003.

Several H5N1 vaccines have been developed and approved, and stockpiled by a number of countries, including the United States (in its National Stockpile), Britain, France, Canada, and Australia, for use in an emergency.

Overview
HPAI A(H5N1) is considered an avian disease, although there is some evidence of limited human-to-human transmission of the virus. A risk factor for contracting the virus is handling of infected poultry, but transmission of the virus from infected birds to humans has been characterized as inefficient. Still, around 60% of humans known to have been infected with the Asian strain of HPAI A(H5N1) have died from it, and H5N1 may mutate or reassort into a strain capable of efficient human-to-human transmission. In 2003, world-renowned virologist Robert G. Webster published an article titled "The world is teetering on the edge of a pandemic that could kill a large fraction of the human population" in American Scientist. He called for adequate resources to fight what he sees as a major world threat to possibly billions of lives. On September 29, 2005, David Nabarro, the newly appointed Senior United Nations System Coordinator for Avian and Human Influenza, warned the world that an outbreak of avian influenza could kill anywhere between 5 million and 150 million people. Experts have identified key events (creating new clades, infecting new species, spreading to new areas) marking the progression of an avian flu virus towards becoming pandemic, and many of those key events have occurred more rapidly than expected.

Due to the high lethality and virulence of HPAI A(H5N1), its endemic presence, its increasingly large host reservoir, and its significant ongoing mutations, in 2006, the H5N1 virus has been regarded to be the world's largest pandemic threat, and billions of dollars are being spent researching H5N1 and preparing for a potential influenza pandemic. At least 12 companies and 17 governments are developing prepandemic influenza vaccines in 28 different clinical trials that, if successful, could turn a deadly pandemic infection into a nondeadly one. Full-scale production of a vaccine that could prevent any illness at all from the strain would require at least three months after the virus's emergence to begin, but it is hoped that vaccine production could increase until one billion doses were produced by one year after the initial identification of the virus.

H5N1 may cause more than one influenza pandemic, as it is expected to continue mutating in birds regardless of whether humans develop herd immunity to a future pandemic strain. Influenza pandemics from its genetic offspring may include influenza A virus subtypes other than H5N1. While genetic analysis of the H5N1 virus shows that influenza pandemics from its genetic offspring can easily be far more lethal than the Spanish flu pandemic, planning for a future influenza pandemic is based on what can be done and there is no higher Pandemic Severity Index level than a Category 5 pandemic which, roughly speaking, is any pandemic as bad as the Spanish flu or worse; and for which all intervention measures are to be used.

Signs and symptoms

In general, humans who catch a humanized influenza A virus (a human flu virus of type A) usually have symptoms that include fever, cough, sore throat, muscle aches, conjunctivitis, and, in severe cases, breathing problems and pneumonia that may be fatal. The severity of the infection depends in large part on the state of the infected persons' immune systems and whether they had been exposed to the strain before (in which case they would be partially immune). No one knows if these or other symptoms will be the symptoms of a humanized H5N1 flu.

The avian influenza hemagglutinin binds alpha 2-3 sialic acid receptors, while human influenza hemagglutinins bind alpha 2-6 sialic acid receptors. This means when the H5N1 strain infects humans, it will replicate in the lower respiratory tract, and consequently will cause viral pneumonia. There is as yet no human form of H5N1, so all humans who have caught it so far have caught avian H5N1.

The reported mortality rate of highly pathogenic H5N1 avian influenza in a human is high; WHO data indicate 60% of cases classified as H5N1 resulted in death. However, there is some evidence the actual mortality rate of avian flu could be much lower, as there may be many people with milder symptoms who do not seek treatment and are not counted.

In one case, a boy with H5N1 experienced diarrhea followed rapidly by a coma without developing respiratory or flu-like symptoms. There have been studies of the levels of cytokines in humans infected by the H5N1 flu virus. Of particular concern is elevated levels of tumor necrosis factor-alpha, a protein associated with tissue destruction at sites of infection and increased production of other cytokines. Flu virus-induced increases in the level of cytokines is also associated with flu symptoms, including fever, chills, vomiting and headache. Tissue damage associated with pathogenic flu virus infection can ultimately result in death. The inflammatory cascade triggered by H5N1 has been called a 'cytokine storm' by some, because of what seems to be a positive feedback process of damage to the body resulting from immune system stimulation. H5N1 induces higher levels of cytokines than the more common flu virus types.

In birds 
Clinical signs of H5N1 in birds range from mild—decrease in egg production, nasal discharge, coughing and sneezing—to severe, including loss of coordination, energy, and appetite; soft-shelled or misshapen eggs; purple discoloration of the wattles, head, eyelids, combs, and hocks; and diarrhea. Sometimes the first noticeable sign is sudden death.

Genetics

The first known strain of HPAI A(H5N1) (called A/chicken/Scotland/59) killed two flocks of chickens in Scotland in 1959, but that strain was very different from the highly pathogenic strain of H5N1. The dominant strain of HPAI A(H5N1) in 2004 evolved from 1999 to 2002 creating the Z genotype. It has also been called "Asian lineage HPAI A(H5N1)".

Asian lineage HPAI A(H5N1) is divided into two antigenic clades. "Clade 1 includes human and bird isolates from Vietnam, Thailand, and Cambodia and bird isolates from Laos and Malaysia. Clade 2 viruses were first identified in bird isolates from China, Indonesia, Japan, and South Korea before spreading westward to the Middle East, Europe, and Africa. The clade 2 viruses have been primarily responsible for human H5N1 infections that have occurred during late 2005 and 2006, according to WHO. Genetic analysis has identified six subclades of clade 2, three of which have a distinct geographic distribution and have been implicated in human infections: Map
 Subclade 1, Indonesia
 Subclade 2, Europe, Middle East, and Africa (called EMA)
 Subclade 3, China"

A 2007 study focused on the EMA subclade has shed further light on the EMA mutations. "The 36 new isolates reported here greatly expand the amount of whole-genome sequence data available from recent avian influenza (H5N1) isolates. Before our project, GenBank contained only 5 other complete genomes from Europe for the 2004–2006 period, and it contained no whole genomes from the Middle East or northern Africa. Our analysis showed several new findings. First, all European, Middle Eastern, and African samples fall into a clade that is distinct from other contemporary Asian clades, all of which share common ancestry with the original 1997 Hong Kong strain. Phylogenetic trees built on each of the 8 segments show a consistent picture of 3 lineages, as illustrated by the HA tree shown in Figure 1. Two of the clades contain exclusively Vietnamese isolates; the smaller of these, with 5 isolates, we label V1; the larger clade, with 9 isolates, is V2. The remaining 22 isolates all fall into a third, clearly distinct clade, labeled EMA, which comprises samples from Europe, the Middle East, and Africa. Trees for the other 7 segments display a similar topology, with clades V1, V2, and EMA clearly separated in each case. Analyses of all available complete influenza (H5N1) genomes and of 589 HA sequences placed the EMA clade as distinct from the major clades circulating in People's Republic of China, Indonesia, and Southeast Asia."

Terminology
H5N1 isolates are identified like this actual HPAI A(H5N1) example, A/chicken/Nakorn-Patom/Thailand/CU-K2/04(H5N1):
 A stands for the genus of influenza (A, B or C).
 chicken is the animal species the isolate was found in (note: human isolates lack this component term and are thus identified as human isolates by default)
 Nakorn-Patom/Thailand is the place this specific virus was isolated
 CU-K2 is the laboratory reference number that identifies it from other influenza viruses isolated at the same place and year
 04 represents the year of isolation 2004
 H5 stands for the fifth of several known types of the protein hemagglutinin.
 N1 stands for the first of several known types of the protein neuraminidase.
Other examples include: A/duck/Hong Kong/308/78(H5N3), A/avian/NY/01(H5N2), A/chicken/Mexico/31381-3/94(H5N2), and A/shoveler/Egypt/03(H5N2).

As with other avian flu viruses, H5N1 has strains called "highly pathogenic" (HP) and "low-pathogenic" (LP). Avian influenza viruses that cause HPAI are highly virulent, and mortality rates in infected flocks often approach 100%. LPAI viruses have negligible virulence, but these viruses can serve as progenitors to HPAI viruses. The strain of H5N1 responsible for the deaths of birds across the world is an HPAI strain; all other strains of H5N1, including a North American strain that causes no disease at all in any species, are LPAI strains. All HPAI strains identified to date have involved H5 and H7 subtypes. The distinction concerns pathogenicity in poultry, not humans. Normally, a highly pathogenic avian virus is not highly pathogenic to either humans or nonpoultry birds. This deadly strain of H5N1 is unusual in being deadly to so many species, including some, like domestic cats, never previously susceptible to any influenza virus.

Genetic structure and related subtypes

H5N1 is a subtype of the species Influenza A virus of the genus Alphainfluenzavirus of the family Orthomyxoviridae. Like all other influenza A subtypes, the H5N1 subtype is an RNA virus. It has a segmented genome of eight negative sense, single-strands of RNA, abbreviated as PB2, PB1, PA, HA, NP, NA, MP and NS.

HA codes for hemagglutinin, an antigenic glycoprotein found on the surface of the influenza viruses and is responsible for binding the virus to the cell that is being infected. NA codes for neuraminidase, an antigenic glycosylated enzyme found on the surface of the influenza viruses. It facilitates the release of progeny viruses from infected cells.
The hemagglutinin (HA) and neuraminidase (NA) RNA strands specify the structure of proteins that are most medically relevant as targets for antiviral drugs and antibodies. HA and NA are also used as the basis for the naming of the different subtypes of influenza A viruses. This is where the H and N come from in H5N1.

Influenza A viruses are significant for their potential for disease and death in humans and other animals. Influenza A virus subtypes that have been confirmed in humans, in order of the number of known human pandemic deaths that they have caused, include:
 H1N1, which caused the 1918 flu pandemic ("Spanish flu") and the 2009 flu pandemic ("swine flu") and is causing seasonal human flu
 H2N2, which caused "Asian flu"
 H3N2, which caused "Hong Kong flu" and causes seasonal human flu
 H5N1, ("bird flu"), which is noted for having a strain (Asian-lineage HPAI H5N1) that kills over half the humans it infects, infecting and killing species that were never known to suffer from influenza viruses before (e.g. cats), being unable to be stopped by culling all involved poultry—some think due to being endemic in wild birds, and causing billions of dollars to be spent in flu pandemic preparation and preventiveness
 H7N7, which has unusual zoonotic potential and killed one person
 H1N2, which is endemic in humans and pigs and causes seasonal human flu
 H9N2, which has infected three people
 H7N2, which has infected two people
 H7N3, which has infected two people
 H10N7, which has infected two people
 H7N9, which as of Feb 2014 has infected 309 people, and lead to 70 deaths

Low pathogenic H5N1
Low pathogenic avian influenza H5N1 (LPAI H5N1) also called "North American" H5N1 commonly occurs in wild birds. In most cases, it causes minor sickness or no noticeable signs of disease in birds. It is not known to affect humans at all. The only concern about it is that it is possible for it to be transmitted to poultry and in poultry mutate into a highly pathogenic strain.
 1966 – LPAI H5N1 A/Turkey/Ontario/6613/1966(H5N1) was detected in a flock of infected turkeys in Ontario, Canada
 1975 – LPAI H5N1 was detected in a wild mallard duck and a wild blue goose in Wisconsin.
 1981 and 1985 – LPAI H5N1 was detected in ducks by the University of Minnesota conducting a sampling procedure in which sentinel ducks were monitored in cages placed in the wild for a short period of time.
 1983 – LPAI H5N1 was detected in ring-billed gulls in Pennsylvania.
 1986 – LPAI H5N1 was detected in a wild mallard duck in Ohio.
 2005 – LPAI H5N1 was detected in ducks in Manitoba, Canada.
 2008 – LPAI H5N1 was detected in ducks in New Zealand.
 2009 – LPAI H5N1 was detected in commercial poultry in British Columbia.

"In the past, there was no requirement for reporting or tracking LPAI H5 or H7 detections in wild birds so states and universities tested wild bird samples independently of USDA. Because of this, the above list of previous detections might not be all inclusive of past LPAI H5N1 detections. However, the World Organization for Animal Health (OIE) recently changed its requirement of reporting detections of avian influenza. Effective in 2006, all confirmed LPAI H5 and H7 AI subtypes must be reported to the OIE because of their potential to mutate into highly pathogenic strains. Therefore, USDA now tracks these detections in wild birds, backyard flocks, commercial flocks and live bird markets."

High mutation rate
Influenza viruses have a relatively high mutation rate that is characteristic of RNA viruses. The segmentation of its genome facilitates genetic recombination by segment reassortment in hosts infected with two different strains of influenza viruses at the same time. A previously uncontagious strain may then be able to pass between humans, one of several possible paths to a pandemic.

The ability of various influenza strains to show species-selectivity is largely due to variation in the hemagglutinin genes. Genetic mutations in the hemagglutinin gene that cause single amino acid substitutions can significantly alter the ability of viral hemagglutinin proteins to bind to receptors on the surface of host cells. Such mutations in avian H5N1 viruses can change virus strains from being inefficient at infecting human cells to being as efficient in causing human infections as more common human influenza virus types. This doesn't mean that one amino acid substitution can cause a pandemic, but it does mean that one amino acid substitution can cause an avian flu virus that is not pathogenic in humans to become pathogenic in humans.

Influenza A virus subtype H3N2 is endemic in pigs in China, and has been detected in pigs in Vietnam, increasing fears of the emergence of new variant strains. The dominant strain of annual flu virus in January 2006 was H3N2, which is now resistant to the standard antiviral drugs amantadine and rimantadine. The possibility of H5N1 and H3N2 exchanging genes through reassortment is a major concern. If a reassortment in H5N1 occurs, it might remain an H5N1 subtype, or it could shift subtypes, as H2N2 did when it evolved into the Hong Kong Flu strain of H3N2.

Both the H2N2 and H3N2 pandemic strains contained avian influenza virus RNA segments. "While the pandemic human influenza viruses of 1957 (H2N2) and 1968 (H3N2) clearly arose through reassortment between human and avian viruses, the influenza virus causing the 'Spanish flu' in 1918 appears to be entirely derived from an avian source".

Prevention

Vaccine
There are several H5N1 vaccines for several of the avian H5N1 varieties, but the continual mutation of H5N1 renders them of limited use to date: while vaccines can sometimes provide cross-protection against related flu strains, the best protection would be from a vaccine specifically produced for any future pandemic flu virus strain. Daniel R. Lucey, co-director of the Biohazardous Threats and Emerging Diseases graduate program at Georgetown University has made this point, "There is no H5N1 pandemic so there can be no pandemic vaccine". However, "pre-pandemic vaccines" have been created; are being refined and tested; and do have some promise both in furthering research and preparedness for the next pandemic. Vaccine manufacturing companies are being encouraged to increase capacity so that if a pandemic vaccine is needed, facilities will be available for rapid production of large amounts of a vaccine specific to a new pandemic strain.

Public health

"The United States is collaborating closely with eight international organizations, including the World Health Organization (WHO), the Food and Agriculture Organization of the United Nations (FAO), the World Organization for Animal Health (OIE), and 88 foreign governments to address the situation through planning, greater monitoring, and full transparency in reporting and investigating avian influenza occurrences. The United States and these international partners have led global efforts to encourage countries to heighten surveillance for outbreaks in poultry and significant numbers of deaths in migratory birds and to rapidly introduce containment measures. The U.S. Agency for International Development (USAID) and the U.S. Department of State, the U.S. Department of Health and Human Services (HHS), and Agriculture (USDA) are coordinating future international response measures on behalf of the White House with departments and agencies across the federal government".

Together steps are being taken to "minimize the risk of further spread in animal populations", "reduce the risk of human infections", and "further support pandemic planning and preparedness".

Ongoing detailed mutually coordinated onsite surveillance and analysis of human and animal H5N1 avian flu outbreaks are being conducted and reported by the USGS National Wildlife Health Center, the Centers for Disease Control and Prevention, the World Health Organization, the European Commission, and others.

Treatment

There is no highly effective treatment for H5N1 flu, but oseltamivir (commercially marketed by Roche as Tamiflu), can sometimes inhibit the influenza virus from spreading inside the user's body. This drug has become a focus for some governments and organizations trying to prepare for a possible H5N1 pandemic. On April 20, 2006, Roche AG announced that a stockpile of three million treatment courses of Tamiflu are waiting at the disposal of the World Health Organization to be used in case of a flu pandemic; separately Roche donated two million courses to the WHO for use in developing nations that may be affected by such a pandemic but lack the ability to purchase large quantities of the drug.

However, WHO expert Hassan al-Bushra has said:
"Even now, we remain unsure about Tamiflu's real effectiveness. As for a vaccine, work cannot start on it until the emergence of a new virus, and we predict it would take six to nine months to develop it. For the moment, we cannot by any means count on a potential vaccine to prevent the spread of a contagious influenza virus, whose various precedents in the past 90 years have been highly pathogenic".

Animal and lab studies suggest that Relenza (zanamivir), which is in the same class of drugs as Tamiflu, may also be effective against H5N1. In a study performed on mice in 2000, "zanamivir was shown to be efficacious in treating avian influenza viruses H9N2, H6N1, and H5N1 transmissible to mammals". In addition, mice studies suggest the combination of zanamivir, celecoxib and mesalazine looks promising producing a 50% survival rate compared to no survival in the placebo arm. While no one knows if zanamivir will be useful or not on a yet to exist pandemic strain of H5N1, it might be useful to stockpile zanamivir as well as oseltamivir in the event of an H5N1 influenza pandemic. Neither oseltamivir nor zanamivir can be manufactured in quantities that would be meaningful once efficient human transmission starts. In September, 2006, a WHO scientist announced that studies had confirmed cases of H5N1 strains resistant to Tamiflu and Amantadine. Tamiflu-resistant strains have also appeared in the EU, which remain sensitive to Relenza.

Epidemiology

The earliest infections of humans by H5N1 coincided with an epizootic (an epidemic in nonhumans) of H5N1 influenza in Hong Kong's poultry population in 1997. This panzootic (a disease affecting animals of many species, especially over a wide area) outbreak was stopped by the killing of the entire domestic poultry population within the territory. However, the disease has continued to spread; outbreaks were reported in Asia again in 2003. On December 21, 2009, the WHO announced a total of 447 cases which resulted in the deaths of 263.

Contagiousness

H5N1 is easily transmissible between birds, facilitating a potential global spread of H5N1. While H5N1 undergoes mutation and reassortment, creating variations which can infect species not previously known to carry the virus, not all of these variant forms can infect humans. H5N1 as an avian virus preferentially binds to a type of galactose receptors that populate the avian respiratory tract from the nose to the lungs and are virtually absent in humans, occurring only in and around the alveoli, structures deep in the lungs where oxygen is passed to the blood. Therefore, the virus is not easily expelled by coughing and sneezing, the usual route of transmission.

H5N1 is mainly spread by domestic poultry, both through the movements of infected birds and poultry products and through the use of infected poultry manure as fertilizer or feed. Humans with H5N1 have typically caught it from chickens, which were in turn infected by other poultry or waterfowl. Migrating waterfowl (wild ducks, geese and swans) carry H5N1, often without becoming sick. Many species of birds and mammals can be infected with HPAI A(H5N1), but the role of animals other than poultry and waterfowl as disease-spreading hosts is unknown.

According to a report by the World Health Organization, H5N1 may be spread indirectly. The report stated the virus may sometimes stick to surfaces or get kicked up in fertilizer dust to infect people.

Virulence
H5N1 has mutated into a variety of strains with differing pathogenic profiles, some pathogenic to one species but not others, some pathogenic to multiple species. Each specific known genetic variation is traceable to a virus isolate of a specific case of infection. Through antigenic drift, H5N1 has mutated into dozens of highly pathogenic varieties divided into genetic clades which are known from specific isolates, but all belong to genotype Z of avian influenza virus H5N1, now the dominant genotype. H5N1 isolates found in Hong Kong in 1997 and 2001 were not consistently transmitted efficiently among birds and did not cause significant disease in these animals. In 2002, new isolates of H5N1 were appearing within the bird population of Hong Kong. These new isolates caused acute disease, including severe neurological dysfunction and death in ducks. This was the first reported case of lethal influenza virus infection in wild aquatic birds since 1961.

Genotype Z emerged in 2002 through reassortment from earlier highly pathogenic genotypes of H5N1 that first infected birds in China in 1996, and first infected humans in Hong Kong in 1997. Genotype Z is endemic in birds in Southeast Asia, has created at least two clades that can infect humans, and is spreading across the globe in bird populations. Mutations occurring within this genotype are increasing their pathogenicity. Birds are also able to shed the virus for longer periods of time before their death, increasing the transmissibility of the virus.

Transmission and host range

Infected birds transmit H5N1 through their saliva, nasal secretions, feces and blood. Other animals may become infected with the virus through direct contact with these bodily fluids or through contact with surfaces contaminated with them. In Arctic temperatures, it does not degrade at all.

Because migratory birds are among the carriers of the highly pathogenic H5N1 virus, it is spreading to all parts of the world. H5N1 is different from all previously known highly pathogenic avian flu viruses in its ability to be spread by animals other than poultry.

In October 2004, researchers discovered H5N1 is far more dangerous than was previously believed. Waterfowl were revealed to be directly spreading this highly pathogenic strain to chickens, crows, pigeons, and other birds, and the virus was increasing its ability to infect mammals, as well. From this point on, avian flu experts increasingly referred to containment as a strategy that can delay, but not ultimately prevent, a future avian flu pandemic.

"Since 1997, studies of influenza A (H5N1) indicate that these viruses continue to evolve, with changes in antigenicity and internal gene constellations; an expanded host range in avian species and the ability to infect felids; enhanced pathogenicity in experimentally infected mice and ferrets, in which they cause systemic infections; and increased environmental stability."

The New York Times, in an article on transmission of H5N1 through smuggled birds, reports Wade Hagemeijer of Wetlands International stating, "We believe it is spread by both bird migration and trade, but that trade, particularly illegal trade, is more important".

On September 29, 2007, researchers reported the H5N1 bird flu virus can also pass through a pregnant woman's placenta to infect the fetus. They also found evidence of what doctors had long suspected—the virus not only affects the lungs, but also passes throughout the body into the gastrointestinal tract, the brain, liver, and blood cells.

In May 2013, North Korea confirmed a H5N1 bird flu outbreak that forced authorities to kill over 160,000 ducks in Pyongyang.

Regional and global outbreaks

2021–2022 outbreaks in Europe/Atlantic flyway 
Over the winter of 2021 and 2022 avian flu spread among the population of barnacle geese on the Solway Firth, UK, with estimates of up to a third of the Svalbard population being lost; pink-footed geese were also affected there and it seems carried the virus to new sites in northern Scotland. The disease was confirmed in sandwich terns in South Africa in April 2022. In late spring 2022 avian flu outbreaks affected many species of wild bird in the United Kingdom, with heavy losses reported among seabirds returning to breed at colonies in the Northern Isles and Outer Hebrides, including great skuas (bonxie) for which outbreaks had initially been reported in 2021 (Scotland hosts c. 60% of the world's breeding population) - the 2022 census on St Kilda showed a 64% decline on 2019 with 106 dead birds recorded so far (to 6 June), gannets (1000+ birds reported dead at the Shetlands' Hermaness colony alone, where there are around 26,000 breeding pairs), with many more gannets being reported dead at other colonies (Troup Head, Bass Rock, and St Kilda); the range of species also seems to be expanding, with reports for many species of wildfowl, seabirds (auks, terns and gulls) and scavenging species (corvids and raptors).

Elsewhere in Europe the virus killed hundreds (574+) of Dalmatian pelicans in Greece, and in Israel around 6000 common cranes were found dead at Hula in December 2021. A report by Scientific Task Force on Avian Influenza and Wild Birds on: "H5N1 Highly Pathogenic Avian Influenza in poultry and wild birds: Winter of 2021/2022 with focus on mass mortality of wild birds in UK and Israel" summarises the situation up to 24 January 2022 and mentions that "H5N8 HPAI is still responsible for poultry and wild bird cases mainly in Asia, H5N1 has now in effect replaced this subtype in Africa and Eurasia in both poultry and wild birds".

2022–2023 global outbreaks

Americas 
Similar to 2021 reports, outbreaks were noted from gannet colonies in Canada, with thousands of birds dead in June 2022, as well as common eiders and great black-backed gulls. Prior to that there were reports of spread in wild birds in over 30 states in the US, including major mortalities in a double-crested cormorant colony in Barrington, Illinois, the virus also spreading to scavengers including three bald eagles in Georgia. Mass die-offs of both birds and mammals were noted in Peru during the 2022–2023 season. In particular, the Peruvian government reported the deaths of approximately 63,000 birds as well as 716 sea lions, with the WHO noting that mammalian spillovers needed to be "monitored closely". In the United States, the 2022–2023 avian outbreak was the worst since H5N1 was first detected.

Ecuador entered into a three-month "animal-health emergency" on 29 November 2022, just days after its first case was reported, whereas  Argentina and Uruguay both declared "national sanitary emergencies" on 15 February 2023, after their respective first cases were discovered.

Europe 
The 2022–2023 season was also the worst recorded outbreak in the United Kingdom, with the British government requiring a so-called "poultry lockdown" which required that farmers keep their birds indoors. Meanwhile, an outbreak of H5N1 on a Spanish mink farm led researchers to believe that they had observed the first case of mammal-to-mammal transmission of H5N1.

Mammalian infections

H5N1 transmission studies in ferrets (2011)

Novel, contagious strains of H5N1 were created by Ron Fouchier of the Erasmus Medical Center in Rotterdam, the Netherlands, who first presented his work to the public at an influenza conference in Malta in September 2011. Three mutations were introduced into the H5N1 virus genome, and the virus was then passed from the noses of infected ferrets to the noses of uninfected ones, which was repeated 10 times. After these 10 passages the H5N1 virus had acquired the ability of transmission between ferrets via aerosols or respiratory droplets.

After Fouchier offered an article describing this work to the leading academic journal Science, the US National Science Advisory Board for Biosecurity (NSABB) recommended against publication of the full details of the study, and the one submitted to Nature by Yoshihiro Kawaoka of the University of Wisconsin describing related work. However, after additional consultations at the World Health Organization and by the NSABB, the NSABB reversed its position and recommended publication of revised versions of the two papers. However, then the Dutch government declared that this type of manuscripts required Fouchier to apply for an export permit in the light of EU directive 428/2009 on dual use goods. After much controversy surrounding the publishing of his research, Fouchier complied (under formal protest) with Dutch government demands to obtain a special permit for submitting his manuscript, and his research appeared in a special issue of the journal Science devoted to H5N1. The papers by Fouchier and Kawaoka conclude that it is entirely possible that a natural chain of mutations could lead to an H5N1 virus acquiring the capability of airborne transmission between mammals, and that a H5N1 influenza pandemic would not be impossible.

In May 2013, it was reported that scientists at the Harbin Veterinary Research Institute in Harbin, China, had created H5N1 strains which passed between guinea pigs.

In response to Fouchier and Kawaoka's work, a number of scientists expressed concerns with the risks of creating novel potential pandemic pathogens, culminating in the formation of the Cambridge Working Group, a consensus statement calling for an assessment of the risks and benefits of such research.

Mammal-to-mammal transmission (2022–2023)
Although mammals, including humans, had become infected with H5N1 bird flu strains in the past, these cases had ostensibly been caused by direct exposure to infected birds, such as through consumption of birds by wildlife or exposure to infected poultry by farmers. In contrast, the October 2022 mammalian outbreak of H5N1 on a Spanish mink farm showed evidence of being the first recorded case of mammal-to-mammal transmission, with 4 percent of the farm's mink population dying from H5N1-related haemorrhagic pneumonia. The mink respiratory tract is particularly well suited to act as a pathway of viral transmission into humans, which has concerned public health professionals due to the production of all but one approved human vaccine requiring the eggs of chickens, which H5N1 kills at a 90-100 percent fatality rate. Infected mink in Spain were also found to have exhibited the "PB2" viral mutation found when H5N1 jumped into pigs over a decade prior, adding to fears that farms could be acting as incubators and/or reservoirs of the virus, similar to the role of minks in SARS-CoV-2.

As of January 2023, fifteen species of wild and captive mammals had become infected with H5N1 throughout the United States. A mass Caspian seal die-off in December 2022, with 700 infected seals found dead along the Caspian Sea coastline of Russia's Dagestan republic, worried researchers regarding the possibility that wild mammal-to-mammal spread had begun.

Human infections
As of May 2020, the WHO reported a total of 861 confirmed human cases which resulted in the deaths of 455 people since 2003.

Human-to-human transmission

Cambodia (2023)
Following the February 2023 H5N1 death of an 11-year-old girl from Cambodia's Prey Veng province, her father was confirmed positive for the virus and several close contacts also began showing signs of infection. On 24 February 2023, the WHO expressed concern that the virus had potentially begun to spread among humans and ordered the production of a new human vaccine for H5N1. Following the confirmed infections, the WHO began working with the Cambodian government to determine whether both individuals had gotten the virus directly from infected poultry or if it had indeed been a case of human-to-human transmission. Further sequencing determined that at least one of the two cases was from an older H5N1 clade, 2.3.2.1c, which had circulated as a common H5N1 strain in Cambodia for many years, rather than the more recent clade 2.3.4.4b, which had caused mass poultry deaths since 2020. This older clade had jumped to humans in the past yet hadn't previously resulted in any known human-to-human transmission.

On March 1, 2023, as Taiwan raised its travel alert for Cambodia, the WHO and the U.S. CDC, in concert with Cambodian authorities, determined that both of the individuals had been infected through direct contact with poultry.

Society and culture

H5N1 has had a significant effect on human society, especially the financial, political, social, and personal responses to both actual and predicted deaths in birds, humans, and other animals. Billions of dollars are being raised and spent to research H5N1 and prepare for a potential avian influenza pandemic. Over $10 billion have been spent and over 200 million birds have been killed to try to contain H5N1.

People have reacted by buying less chicken, causing poultry sales and prices to fall. Many individuals have stockpiled supplies for a possible flu pandemic. International health officials and other experts have pointed out that many unknown questions still hover around the disease.

Dr. David Nabarro, Chief Avian Flu Coordinator for the United Nations, and former Chief of Crisis Response for the World Health Organization has described himself as "quite scared" about H5N1's potential impact on humans. Nabarro has been accused of being alarmist before, and on his first day in his role for the United Nations, he proclaimed the avian flu could kill 150 million people. In an interview with the International Herald Tribune, Nabarro compares avian flu to AIDS in Africa, warning that underestimations led to inappropriate focus for research and intervention.

In February 2020 an outbreak of H5N1 avian flu occurred in Shuangqing District of Shaoyang City, in the Hunan province. After poultry had become ill from the virus the city killed close to 18,000 chickens to prevent the spread of the illness. Hunan borders Hubei province where Wuhan is located, the epicenter of the coronavirus pandemic.

See also
 Antigenic shift
 Avian influenza virus
 Favipiravir
 Fujian flu
 H5N1 clinical trials
 H7N9
 Influenza research
 Influenzavirus A
 International Conference on Emerging Infectious Diseases
 National Influenza Centers
 Swine influenza
 Zoonosis

Notes

References

Citations

Sources 

 Analysis of the efficacy of an adjuvant-based inactivated pandemic H5N1 influenza virus vaccine. https://link.springer.com/article/10.1007%2Fs00705-019-04147-7 Ainur NurpeisovaEmail authorMarkhabat KassenovNurkuisa RametovKaissar TabynovGourapura J. RenukaradhyaYevgeniy VolginAltynay SagymbayAmanzhol MakbuzAbylay SansyzbayBerik Khairullin
Research Institute for Biological Safety Problems (RIBSP), Zhambyl Region, Republic of Kazakhstan

External links

 Influenza Research Database – Database of influenza genomic sequences and related information.
 WHO World Health Organization
 WHO's Avian Flu Facts Sheet for 2006
 Epidemic and Pandemic Alert and Response Guide to WHO's H5N1 pages
 Avian Influenza Resources (updated) – tracks human cases and deaths
 National Influenza Pandemic Plans
 WHO Collaborating Centres and Reference Laboratories Centers, names, locations, and phone numbers
 FAO Avian Influenza portal Information resources, animations, videos, photos
 FAO Food and Agriculture Organisation – Bi-weekly Avian Influenza Maps – tracks animal cases and deaths
 FAO Bird Flu disease card
 FAO Socio-Economic impact of AI Projects, Information resources
 OIE World Organisation for Animal Health – tracks animal cases and deaths
 Official outbreak reports by country 
 Official outbreak reports by week
 Chart of outbreaks by country 

European Union
 Health-EU Portal EU response to Avian Influenza.
 

United Kingdom
 Exotic Animal Disease Generic Contingency Plan – DEFRA generic contingency plan for controlling and eradicating an outbreak of an exotic animal disease. PDF hosted by BBC.
 UK Influenza Pandemic Contingency Plan by the National Health Service – a government entity. PDF hosted by BBC
 UK Department of Health 

United States
 Center for Infectious Disease Research and Policy  Avian Influenza (Bird Flu): Implications for Human Disease – An overview of Avian Influenza
 PandemicFlu.Gov U.S. Government's avian flu information site
 USAID U.S. Agency for International Development – Avian Influenza Response
 CDC, Centers for Disease Control and Prevention – responsible agency for avian influenza in humans in US – Facts About Avian Influenza (Bird Flu) and Avian Influenza A (H5N1) Virus
 USGS – NWHC National Wildlife Health Center – responsible agency for avian influenza in animals in US
 Wildlife Disease Information Node A part of the National Biological Information Infrastructure and partner of the NWHC, this agency collects and distributes news and information about wildlife diseases such as avian influenza and coordinates collaborative information sharing efforts.
 HHS U.S. Department of Health & Human Services's Pandemic Influenza Plan

 
Bird diseases
H5N1